Martha (Original title: S/S Martha) is a 1967 Danish comedy film directed by Erik Balling and starring Ove Sprogøe. It enjoys a cult following.

Cast

 Ove Sprogøe - Hovmester Watson
 Morten Grunwald - 2nd Engineer Knud Hansen
 Poul Reichhardt - Chief Engineer Brovst
 Poul Bundgaard - 2nd Engineer Alf
 Karl Stegger - Kaptajn Peter Nielsen
 Preben Kaas - Kokken
 Helge Kjærulff-Schmidt - Skibsreder O.P. Andersen
 Lily Weiding - Frk. Bruun
 Hanne Borchsenius - Lone Andersen
 Eleni Anousaki - Laura
 Henrik Wiehe - Styrmanden
 Birger Jensen - Halfdan
 Paul Hagen - Telegraph operator Marius Knudsen
 Bjørn Puggaard-Müller - Johansen
 Gunnar Bigum - Regnskabschef
 Holger Vistisen - Dørmand
 Sverre Wilberg - Skibsreder Amundsen
 Sotiris Moustakas - Hector
 Antonis Papadopoulos - Aias
 Odd Wolstad - Kaptajn på Harald
 Lone Luther - Rengøringsdame
 Stavros Christofides - Fyrbøder Alexander

References

External links

1967 films
1967 comedy films
1960s Danish-language films
Danish comedy films
Films directed by Erik Balling
Films with screenplays by Erik Balling